Daniel "Dani" Guindos López (born 19 April 1984) is a Spanish professional football manager and former player who is an assistant coach for Ligue 1 club AS Monaco.

Club career
Born on 19 April 1984 in Gijón, Spain, Guindos began his youth career at Sporting Gijón aged nine. After several years, Guindos played senior football at La Braña, before joining Llano 2000.

Managerial career
Guindos started his managerial career with the youth team of Real Madrid. Guindos became the head coach of Alcorcón B in 2018, staying there one season. In October 2019 he was appointed coach of Equatorial Guinea, becoming the youngest head coach to date. He was dismissed on 7 November 2019. After that, he became an assistant coach for AS Monaco.

References

External links
 

1984 births
Living people
Spanish footballers
Spanish football managers
Footballers from Gijón
Real Madrid CF non-playing staff
Equatorial Guinea national football team managers
AS Monaco FC non-playing staff
Spanish expatriate football managers
Expatriate football managers in Equatorial Guinea
Spanish expatriate sportspeople in Equatorial Guinea
Expatriate football managers in France
Spanish expatriate sportspeople in France
Association footballers not categorized by position